Viswasam is a 2019 Indian Tamil-language action drama film written and directed by Siva. The film stars Ajith Kumar, Nayanthara, Jagapathi Babu. Produced by Sathya Jyothi Films, the film was officially announced on 20 November 2017 and principal photography began in May 2018.

The film was released on 10 January 2019 and performed well at the box office. The film received mixed reviews praising the performances(particularly Ajith Kumar and Jagapathi Babu), action sequences, soundtrack, film's score and emotional quotient but criticism for the direction, screenplay, and predictable plot.
 D. Imman won Best Music Director at the 67th National Film Awards.

Plot 
  
Thookku Durai is the well-respected chieftain of his village Koduvilarpatti in Theni. After ten years, a Thiruvizha(Tamil:festival) is set to occur at the village's Ayyanar temple, when Thooku Durai's rival Kozhimuthu tries to stop it from occurring. But Thooku Durai's pride scares him and his henchman, so the Thiruvizha happens as planned; however, his family and his friends have been longing to see his wife and his daughter. After much deliberation, Thooku Durai decides to go to Mumbai to meet them. During the journey, Thooku Durai's uncles's Merit and Rosamani are upset over Thooku Durai's current life and reminces his life 10–12 years ago. Thooku Durai used to be a happy-go-lucky man and a rice mill owner, who uses violent ways to deal with problems. 

While chasing a few goons, Thooku Durai stumbles across a doctor named Niranjana, who witnesses his antics and lodges a case against him. When Thooku Durai sees Niranjana, he immediately falls for her and surrenders him to the police. but she is later forced to release him after Aavudaiyappan threatens to close her medical camp unless she pays him. After fighting the goons, Thooku Durai relocates her field to his rice mill. Niranjana realizes her love for Thooku Durai and proposes to him, which he accepts after some consideration. They get married and lead a happy life, but Niranjana is disturbed by Thooku Durai's involvement in feuds. Soon, she gets pregnant and is accepted to go to one of the most exceptional pharmaceutical programs abroad, which she refuses for Thooku Durai. 

After their daughter Swetha is born, Niranjana leaves out of town, after getting a promise from Thooku Durai not to bring Swetha to any fights. On the way to pick her from the station, Aavudaiyappan, who is waiting for revenge, picks up a fight with Thooku Durai. Not finding Niranjana at the train station, Thooku Durai finds her at home, and the baby passes out as she had been injured during the fight. After rushing to the emergency ward, she survives, but Niranjana gets infuriated at Thooku Durai and tells him to stay away from her and the child. She leaves the village to the city. After the flashback, Thooku Durai tries to meet up with Niranjana at her company Niranjana Pharmaceuticals Pvt Ltd, but to no avail. He later sees his daughter Swetha, who is in contention for the Junior National 100 m title. 

Swetha travels home when attempts are made to kill her. Thooku Durai arrives at the nick of time to save her. It is then revealed that Gautham Veer is the one behind this as his daughter Neha had been paralyzed while attempting suicide. Gautham is the Chief Executive Officer of Skyline exports and owns a range of multinational companies, and expects the first position in everything, as he used to achieve the same in his earlier days, including academics and sports. He expects the same of his daughter Neha, who is slower than Swetha by milliseconds. After Gautham threatens Neha that she would find no affection in him if she loses, she resorts to doping, which helps her win the race. Unfortunately, this is found out by Swetha, who reports it to the authorities. Fearing that her father's reputation and affection would completely vanish, Neha attempts suicide but becomes paralyzed in the process. 

Gautham is distraught on seeing his daughter's condition and vows to have Swetha killed at any cost. After saving her, Thooku Durai requests Niranjana to appoint him as Swetha's driver for the next ten days, until her competition, on the condition that he does not reveal about him being her father, to which she reluctantly agrees. He enjoys being in the company of his daughter while saving her from goons on multiple occasions. Thooku Durai later meets Gautham and challenges him. Unfortunately, Thooku Durai is run over by a car before Swetha's competition and is critical. Swetha then is forced to leave for America, and Thooku Durai recovers. Swetha also brings Gautham's daughter and wife. Before the competition, Gautham fights an already injured Thooku Durai, at which point Niranjana reveals that Thooku Durai is Swetha's father. Swetha lags during the meet as she has no encouragement. 

Thooku Durai fights Gautham back, reaches the track, and encourages his daughter by whistling. Swetha wins the race. At the same time, Gautham arrives on the road to attack Thooku Durai, but after seeing his daughter's recovery, he realizes his mistake. Thooku Durai tells Gautham that children should grow up as they desire and not burden them with what their parents want. Swetha is announced as the winner, along with Thooku Durai's name added to her name by Niranjana, and they reunite with Thooku Durai.

Cast

Production

Development 

The collaboration between Sathya Jyothi Films, director Siva, and actor Ajith Kumar was announced via the studio's official Twitter handle in late November 2017, after months of speculation on Ajith Kumar's next project. Nayanthara was announced as the lead actress in early February 2018. D. Imman was signed on to work as the film's music composer, which marked his first collaboration with Ajith Kumar and Siva. This would be Yogi Babu's 100th film as an actor.

Filming 

Principal photography was supposed to begin on 23 March 2018 but was pushed back significantly to the Tamil Film Producers Council's strike. It eventually began on 7 May at Hyderabad, and wrapped in November 2018 and released for Pongal 2019.

Music 

The soundtrack album is composed by D. Imman, making his first collaboration with Ajith Kumar and Siva. The background music was copied for the Bollywood film Marjaavaan, directed by Milap Milan Zaveri and starring Sidharth Malhotra, Tara Sutaria and Riteish Deshmukh in lead roles.

Release

Theatrical 
Viswasam was released on 10 January 2019, coinciding with the occasion of Thai Pongal festival along with Rajinikanth starrer Petta.

Home media 
The film was released on digital platform Amazon Prime Video on 25 February 2019. The satellite rights were sold to Sun Network.

Reception

Box office
The film collected  in India in 2 days. The film collected  worldwide in 3 weeks.

Critical response
The film received mixed reviews praising the performances(particularly Ajith Kumar and Jagapathi Babu), action sequences, soundtrack, film's score and emotional quotient but criticism for the direction, screenplay, and predictable plot

. The Times of India rated 3/5, stating, "The film follows the regular template in its narration and changes track at a point keeping in mind to reach all sections of audience. The plot also becomes predictable once the real story unfolds. But the lack of evident flaws make it a one time watch entertainer".Behind Woods rated 3/5 stating "Viswasam is packaged with right commercial elements to satisfy the family audience and Thala fans".Film Companion rated 3/5 stating "A lot of mainstream filmmaking is about finding new ways to tell the same old story. With Viswasam, Siva does more. He justifies his star’s faith in (and perseverance with) him".First Post rated 3/5 stating "Viswasam has several moments worth paying a visit to the theatre. The bang for buck interval fight sequence in the rain is one of the highlights of the film. As a pair, Ajith and Siva make a strong comeback with the film, which has its issues but makes for quite an entertaining watch anyway".India Glitz rated 3/5 stating "Viswasam is Siva – Ajith combo's emotional Pongal treat for families".Sify rated 3/5 stating "Ajith is endearing and is in tremendous form that the actor looks super energetic as Thooku Durai. Viswasam is a pucca family entertainer for this Pongal festival. Go and enjoy with your family!".India Today rated 2.5 out of 5 stars stating "After churning out an underwhelming spy thriller Vivegam, Ajith and director Siruthai Siva go back to the rural route with Viswasam. But the film does not do justice to expectations and is impressive only in parts, says our review".The News Minute rated 2 out of 5 stars stating "After touring Eastern Europe in 'Vivegam', Siva brings Ajith back to Tamil Nadu and it proves to be a wise move".The Hindu stated "The problem with the film is that it offers very little for Ajith, the star".Hindustan Times rated 1.5 out of 5 stars stating "While the idea would have been to make audience feel the moment of sweet victory, all it does is ruin the palette for those who enjoy a good commercial film".Deccan Chronicle stated "Though there’s nothing new by way of story, Siva has made a movie that is all about a mass star – Thala Ajith".Cinema Express rated 2.5 out of 5 stars stating "Director Siva's biggest achievement is giving us an Ajith who is having fun on screen after a long time, apart from which the film mainly works on surprise value".

Accolades

Notes

References

External links 
 

2010s Tamil-language films
2019 films
2019 action drama films
Films directed by Siva (director)
Films scored by D. Imman
Films shot in Hyderabad, India
Indian action drama films
2019 masala films